These singles topped the Ultratop 50 in 2010.

See also
2010 in music

References

Ultratop 50 number-one singles
Belgium
2010 50